Narcanon is a misspelling which could refer to:

 Narconon, the substance abuse program associated with the Church of Scientology, founded in 1966

Narcanon should not be confused with these unrelated organisations:
 Narcotics Anonymous (NA), the twelve-step program of recovery from drug addiction, founded in 1953
 Nar-Anon, the twelve-step program for friends and family members of drug addicts, established in 1968